Jodh Singh Ramgarhia (1758 – 23 August 1815) was a prominent Sikh leader of the Ramgarhia Misl in the Punjab, the son of Jassa Singh Ramgarhia who inherited Jassa's position on his death in 1803. His Ramgarhia followers played an important role in the  struggle when Maharaja Ranjit Singh was establishing the Sikh Empire.

Jodh was instrumental in persuading Mai Sukhan, widow of Gulab Singh Bhangi and ruler of Amritsar to surrender to Ranjit Singh on 24 February 1805 and to hand over the massive Zamzama gun.
He fought with Ranjit Singh in the Battle of Kasur, and was awarded many estates by the Maharajah.
He was responsible for the construction of the Ramgarhia Bunga adjoining the Golden Temple of Amritsar, a residence for guards of the temple, using materials that had been collected by his father.

On his death in 1815 there was a dispute over succession to his estates between his widow, his brother Vir Singh and his cousins Diwan Singh and Mehtab Singh. The Maharajah eventually split the estates between them.

Gallery

References

1758 births
1815 deaths
Indian Sikhs
Sikh warriors
History of Punjab
Punjabi people
Ramgarhia people